Katty García (born 1988) is an Ecuadorian theater and television actress, who played the role of Beverly in the telenovela 3 familias of Ecuavisa.

Theatre
Toda esta larga noche
Ay mamá
Hola, soy tu vagina
Tres Familias

Television
Historias personales
El exitoso Lcdo. Cardoso
Aída
La Pareja Feliz 5
Vivos
3 Familias

References

1988 births
21st-century Ecuadorian actresses
Ecuadorian stage actresses
Ecuadorian telenovela actresses
Ecuadorian television actresses
Living people